Norman Edward Hargreaves (November 4, 1943 – November 3, 2005) was an amateur and professional hockey player, coach and teacher. He played for the bronze-medal winning Canadian men's hockey team at the 1968 Winter Olympics in Grenoble, France.

Hargreaves played his minor hockey in Foam Lake, Saskatchewan, where he suited up for the senior Foam Lake Flyers.  He also played junior hockey for the Melville Millionaires, and professionally for the Winnipeg Jets of the WHA. He finished his career in Nelson, British Columbia, where he played and coached the Nelson Maple Leafs of the Western International Hockey League. He taught high school and was instrumental in developing hockey programs in Nelson.

Statistics
                                    Regular Season        Playoffs 
Season Team Lge                     GP G A Pts PIM      GP G A Pts PIM 
1966–67 Canadian National Team Intl     Statistics Unavailable      
1968–69 Canadian National Team Intl     Statistics Unavailable      
1969–70 Tulsa Oilers CHL            62 23 27 50 27       6 1 1 2 6 
1969–70 Seattle Totems WHL          -- -- -- -- --       5 0 0 0 2 
1970–71 Tulsa Oilers CHL            47 3  10 13 11       -- -- -- -- -- 
1972–73 Nelson Maple Leafs WIHL     47 18 33 51 43      
1973–74 Winnipeg Jets WHA           74 7  12 19 15       4 0 1 1 10 
1974–75 Nelson Maple Leafs WIHL     38 16 32 48 31      
1975–76 Nelson Maple Leafs WIHL     48 31 39 70 113      
1976–77 Nelson Maple Leafs WIHL      0  4  5  9  8      
 
                   WHA Totals       74 7 12 19 15        4 0 1 1 10

External links
 

1943 births
2005 deaths
Canadian ice hockey centres
Canadian ice hockey right wingers
Ice hockey people from Saskatchewan
Ice hockey players at the 1968 Winter Olympics
Medalists at the 1968 Winter Olympics
Olympic ice hockey players of Canada
Olympic bronze medalists for Canada
Olympic medalists in ice hockey
Sportspeople from Weyburn
Seattle Totems (WHL) players
Winnipeg Jets (WHA) players